Danielle Margaret Small (born 7 February 1979) is  a retired Australian soccer player, who played for Sydney FC in the Australian W-League.

Small has represented Australia at the 2003 FIFA Women's World Cup, the 2004 Olympics, and the 2007 FIFA Women's World Cup. She played in the USA Collegiate NCAA Division One Soccer Competition finishing her career at San Diego State University in 2001, studying Exercise Physiology. Previous colleges include University of Mobile, Alabama, and Phillips University in Enid, Oklahoma. Small played two seasons in the U.S. WPSL, representing the Jackson Calypso, Mississippi in 1998, and the Adirondack Lynx, New York in 2006. She completed a degree in Biomedical Science, Forensic Biology at The University of Technology, Sydney in 2010.

Small was married to cricketer Phil Jaques. The couple met in 2000, got engaged in 2004 and were married from 2006 to 2009.

International goals

Notes

External links
 Football Australia Profile
 Sydney FC profile

1983 births
Living people
Australian women's soccer players
Sydney FC (A-League Women) players
A-League Women players
San Diego State University alumni
University of Mobile alumni
Phillips Haymakers women's soccer players
University of Technology Sydney alumni
Olympic soccer players of Australia
Footballers at the 2004 Summer Olympics
2003 FIFA Women's World Cup players
2007 FIFA Women's World Cup players
Australia women's international soccer players
Soccer players from Sydney
Women's association football midfielders
San Diego State Aztecs women's soccer players
Adirondack Lynx players
Women's Premier Soccer League players
Expatriate women's soccer players in the United States
Australian expatriate sportspeople in the United States